Revenue cycle management (RCM) is the process used by healthcare systems in the United States and all over the world to track the revenue from patients, from their initial appointment or encounter with the healthcare system to their final payment of balance. It is a normal part of health administration. The revenue cycle can be defined as, "all administrative and clinical functions that contribute to the capture, management, and collection of patient service revenue." It is a cycle that describes and explains the life cycle of a patient (and subsequent revenue and payments) through a typical healthcare encounter from admission (registration) to final payment (or adjustment off of accounts receivables).

Overview
The revenue cycle begins when a patient schedules an appointment and it ends when the healthcare provider has accepted all payments. Errors in revenue cycle management can lead to the healthcare provider receiving delayed payments or no payment at all. Because the revenue cycle process is complex and subject to regulatory oversight, healthcare providers can turn over their revenue cycle management to companies that handle this complex process with specialized agents and proprietary technologies to manage healthcare provider revenue cycles.

Proper revenue cycle management ensures that billing errors are reduced so that reimbursements from the insurance companies are maximized. Revenue cycle management teams are responsible for maintaining compliance with coding regulations, such as the ICD-10 code update. Using the right coding for services rendered by a practice ensures that insurance claims can be processed and that the practitioner is compensated for all of their services rendered.

In 2014 the revenue cycle management market was valued at $18.3 billion and at $260 billion in 2020.

For remittance received in 2014, the average physician practice took 18 days to generate a claim after the date of service and had an 11% denial rate.

Revenue cycle management is often considered a segment of the greater healthcare IT industry which includes HIS, RIS, EHR, PACS, CPOE, VNA, mHealth, healthcare analytics, telehealth, supply chain management, CRM, fraud management, and claims management.

Registration

The first function within the revenue cycle is the registration function, which allows the service provider to obtain all of the necessary data needed in order to properly bill an insurance company (per the ANSI 837 5010 standards and requirements). The information that is usually obtained is the patient's full name, date of birth, address, email, phone number, marital status, gender, social security number, emergency contact, release of information, primary insurance provider information. Clerical errors that are made within patient registration processes are one of the biggest culprits that cause non-clinical denials from insurance payers.  This can include many errors such as inputting an incorrect date of birth, not validating current insurance coverage/benefits, misspelling a guarantor's name, etc.  Normally, these errors are usually easy to identify and amend upon submitting a new bill to most payers after correcting a mistake made in the registration department.  It is critically important to monitor denials on a daily basis in order to identify how much denial ratio is generated from these clerical errors so that both training and education can take place with the appropriate staff within the registration department.

Medical coding
An important aspect of the revenue cycle is compliance with medical coding regulations. Such regulations generally require keeping track of what treatments are provided to patients and for what reason, and medical coding is a standardized way of record such information (and sharing it with third parties, such as insurers). Optimal coding compliance results in higher revenues and decreases claim denials from insurance companies. By achieving optimal coding, a medical practice can prevent disruption of the medical flow and avoid regulatory penalties.

Billing/collections

Otherwise known as the Business Office or Patient Financial Services department, the billing/collections team are responsible for submitting a complete UB-04 claim (facility and ancillary billing) or a CMS1500 form (physician billing) to the insurance payers after a patient has received services for either an inpatient or outpatient type of visit.  Usually, a third-party claim scrubbing system is then used to ensure that claims are clean and complete as possible, including edits that may automatically update the raw claim data received from the host system. The intention of this scrubbing is to inevitably avoid generating a potential denial from the payer, which can prolong reimbursement to a provider. The claim is then sent out from the provider to the payer in an ANSI 837 5010 standard format.

Denials can be sent back as a response to the claim from the payer stating a specific reason of why the claim cannot be adjudicated.  This is where denial management processes help to ensure that there is an immediate resolution to these denials.  Denial management can also help to identify if there are trending issues within a provider's workflow processes, whether it be clinical or clerical-related.  Feedback should be provided to the responsible revenue cycle departments if any of them were the cause of the denial, especially with denial types such as medical necessity, registration/clerical entry errors, etc. In the current market scenario, there is a growing demand for revenue cycle management solutions.

References

Healthcare in the United States